Highway 788 is a provincial highway in the Canadian province of Saskatchewan. It runs from Highway 693 until it transitions into Highway 355. Highway 788 is about 16 km (10 mi.) long.

Highway 788 passes near the town of Deer Ridge.

See also 
Roads in Saskatchewan
Transportation in Saskatchewan

References 

788